Udo Kasemets (November 16, 1919 – January 19, 2014) was a Canadian composer of orchestral, chamber, vocal, piano and electroacoustic works. He was one of the first composers to adopt the methods of John Cage, and was also a conductor, lecturer, pianist, organist, teacher and writer.

Kasemets was born in Tallinn, Estonia, and trained at the Tallinn Conservatory and the Akademie der Musik in Stuttgart. In 1950, he attended the Kranichstein Institut für neue Musik in Darmstadt, where he became familiar with the music and philosophies of Ernst Krenek, Hermann Scherchen and Edgard Varèse. He emigrated to Canada in 1951, and became a Canadian citizen in 1957.

From the 1950s, Kasemets was active in Hamilton, Ontario and Toronto, Ontario in Canada. He taught at the Royal Hamilton College of Music and served as conductor of the Hamilton Conservatory Chorus, until 1957. He was music critic for the Toronto Daily Star 1959–63 and taught at the Brodie School of Music and Modern Dance 1963–67.

In 1962–63, he organized Toronto's first new music series Men, Minds and Music, and established the Isaacs Gallery Mixed Media Concerts. In 1968, he directed the first Toronto Festival of Arts and Technology entitled SightSoundSystems and founded and edited a new music publication series, Canavangard. In 1971, Kasemets joined the Faculty of the Department of Experimental Art at the Ontario College of Art, where he taught until retiring in 1987.

Kasemets' significant influences include Erik Satie, Marcel Duchamp, James Joyce, John Cage, James Tenney, Morton Feldman, Merce Cunningham, Buckminster Fuller, and Stephen Hawking. Other strong influences especially evident in his later work include the Chinese I Ching and fractal music.

Kasemets lived in Toronto, Ontario.

Selected works 

 Requiem Renga, for the victims of wars and violence in our time (1992) for fifteen strings and two percussionists, based on the Japanese renga chain poetry form.
 Palestrina on Devil's Staircase, with Dis(Con)sonant Contrapuntal Connections (1993) for three violins, three cellos, and two sopranos, music based on the eponymous fractal and also commemorating the 400th anniversary of Palestrina's death in 1994.
 The Eight Hosues of the I-Ching (1993) for twelve strings

References

Further reading
Steenhuisen, Paul.  "Interview with Udo Kasemets".  In Sonic Mosaics: Conversations with Composers.  Edmonton:  University of Alberta Press, 2009.  
Tenney, James. "Citation for Udo Kasemets." MusicWorks (Spring 1995) : 62, 6–7.
Kasemets, Udo. "Systems : Concise Summary of I Ching Systems. | I Ching Music John Cage and I Ching | I Ching and I." MusicWorks (Spring 1995) : 62, 7-21.

External links

 
 Archival papers and manuscripts at University of Toronto Music Library
 http://composers21.com/compdocs/kasemetu.htm at The Living Composers Project

1919 births
2014 deaths
20th-century Canadian composers
20th-century Canadian male musicians
21st-century Canadian composers
21st-century Canadian male musicians
21st-century classical composers
Canadian classical composers
Canadian male classical composers
Canadian people of Estonian descent
Estonian World War II refugees
Estonian emigrants to Canada
Musicians from Hamilton, Ontario
Musicians from Tallinn
Musicians from Toronto
State University of Music and Performing Arts Stuttgart alumni